The 2015 Florida Marine Raiders season was the third season for the X-League Indoor Football (X-League) franchise, and their first season in X-League.

Schedule

Regular season
All start times are local to home team

Postseason

Standings

 z-Indicates best regular season record
 x-Indicates clinched playoff berth

Roster

References

Florida Marine Raiders
Florida Marine Raiders
Florida Marine Raiders